Demon's Lair was a fantasy role-playing game system created in 1997 by Lasalion Games, from Wisconsin. It used a 3-die step system for combat (one die was used for attacking, one for defending, and one for spells and mental abilities).

Game mechanics

Classes
Demon's Lair used a dual-class system. The basic class was the definer of your core abilities, and your "profession" was used to fine-tune your abilities.

There were three class-headers in Demon's Lair, which would determine things such as hit points, combat dice, and skills. There were Warrior Classes (Archer, Fighter, Martial Artist, Street Fighter, Weapon Master), Rogue Classes (Bard, Investigator, Spy, Thief, Thrill Seeker), Scholar Classes (Cleric, Mage, Psychic, Sage, Shaman), and the "miscellaneous" classes of Civilian and Djorre'l. The djorre'l was a jack-of-all-trades sort of class, with harsh hindrances to make up for the excessive benefits.

Once a class was picked, you could add a profession, which would add and modify to your abilities and skills. Professions were not required for a character, however, and later supplements to the rules would show that a character was better off not choosing a profession.

Races
Demon's Lair used most of the common fantasy races, including the gnome, dwarf, human, elf, and orc. However, they did have some unique races, including the following:

-Dakhan - This was an evil race, similar to the dark elf of D&D, but wasn't subterranean. They were also not connected with the elven race.

-Draga - This was a race of lizardmen, who would look similar to man-sized dragons.

-Færies - Shorter in height (between dwarves & humans), with fairy wings and colorful hair/skin/eyes.

-Ithok - Very human-like in nature, but stronger & stockier, and with improved eyesight (each eye had two pupils).

-Tarn - Tarns were metallic-skinned kins of elves & dwarves, with a strict caste society.

-Toppan- Toppan were a race of cat like people, very dignified and majestic, taller the most humans and sleeker.

Magic
The magic system used Magic Points, and the players would find grand tomes to copy, which would allow them to attain the spells from that grand tome (examples: Book of Fire; Book of Ritual Magic, Book of Summoning). So, if you were 5th level, and had the book of Summoning, your character would be able to cast any spell from that book that was 5th level or lower, as long as you had enough MP. Also, many spells had abstract MP levels to cast it, which would affect the damage taken to the target of the spell on a 1:1 ratio. For example, if Billy the mage cast the spell "Flame Bolt" on Jeramiah the fighter, and he had 50 MP available to him, he could blow all his MP and do 45 damage to Jeramiah the fighter (5 MP base cost +45 MP damage).

Combat
In Demon's Lair, combat was run using a die-vs-die system. The attacker would roll his "Combat Die" (CD) versus the opponents "Physical Defense Die" (PDD). After modifiers are added, the high roll wins. (ties went to the attacker) All weapons did a set amount of damage. Magical attacks would work in a similar fashion, where the spellcaster's "Magic Defense Die" (MDD) would roll off against the defender's MDD. The high roll would win. Order in the round would be determined by a d10 roll of "Order of Combat" (OoC).

Your character's CD, PDD, & MDD were determined by your class-heading. Each class-header would get a d10, d8, and a d12 for each die-type.

Terrania
Characters in the Demon's Lair game system would tromp around in the make-believe world of Terrania. The politics of Terrania were such that, at the point of the system being released, the kingdoms were all-encompassing within the continents. The continents were spaced apart within 1 to 2 week boat rides. Five of the kingdoms were formally the mega-continent of Lasalion, which was torn asunder during the war with the demon, Torlon. The remaining kingdoms were known as the "outlands."

Bonlund
Bonlund was a kingdom that was north of the central kingdom of Dybana, and was one of the continents that tore apart from the original continent of Lasalion. It had a similar culture to that of 14th-century England.

Shatashatora
Another former Lasalion continent, it was a  kingdom to the west of Dybana. The styles & cultures were similar to that of dynastic China, and feudal Japan.

Mastma
Mastma lied east of the central kingdom of Dybana, and was the third Lasalion continent. It was a desert land, with small similarities to ancient Egypt, but with more similarities to a gun-free American west. (the tech for firearms was not developed on Terrania as yet)

Norfic
The fourth Lasalion continent fell south of Dybana, the central kingdom. It was mostly filled with nomadic tribes, and had a culture similar in style to Scandinavia.

Dybana
Dybana was the fifth Lasalion continent, sitting in the middle of the four continents mentioned above. It was a kingdom of closely lain large islands, and had a culture similar to that of the ancient Greeks & Romans (if they would have had Renaissance technologies). The former capital of the Lasalion Empire, Fata Morgana, is currently underwater after the continental split.

Magansi
Magansi was a floating island, of the size of Australia. It was a haven for scholars, and had the holy shrine of the magic god atop the highest peak on it. Magansi was ripped from Terrania at the time that the Lasalion continent was torn apart.

Saopolo
Saopolo was one of the outland continents, and was found east of Bonlund and north of Mastma. Its climate ranged from tropical rain-forest in the south, to frigid fir-tree forests in the north. In the dead-center of the continent lies "The Chaos," which was a tear in the fabric of the prime-material plane. If you ventured into the Chaos, it was quite difficult to get out. The culture of Saopolo was a combination of Southern US and Brazil, with Renaissance technology.

Druu
Druu was an outland kingdom of harsh cold. It could be found to the northwest of Bonlund, and north of Shatashatora. Druu was the home of the ithok race, and the culture was similar to that of Russia.

Tarnia
Tarnia was an outland kingdom west of Norfic and southwest of Shatashatora. It's the home of the tarn race, but also has some non-tarn settlements.

Dakharra
Dakharra was an outland kingdom that sat north of Tarnia, south of Druu, far east of Mastma, and west of Shatashatora. It's the home of the Dakhans, and was an evil empire that would regularly attack Tarnia, Shatashatora, and Mastma.

Mordestan
Mordestan was an outland kingdom that was northeast of Norfic and southeast of Mastma. The culture was similar to that of eastern-Europe and Transylvania. Mordestan also had quite the undead problem.

Opinions
Some gamers enjoyed the system immensely, as the skills & battle skills systems made the average character very customizable. Others felt that the game was excessively tilted towards power-gaming & munchkining. There were also issues with the lack of seriousness in the system. The spell system also had a fatal flaw, in that spellcasters of low levels could blast out a spell that could kill most anyone, as long as they had the MP for it.

This game is currently out-of-print; Lasalion Games went out of business in June 2004.

Rulebooks and supplements

Books available
Tome of Rules (core player's rulebook)
The God Guide (core Game Master's rulebook)
The Ancient Tomes (spellcaster supplement)
Lasalion's Bazaar (items & weaponry supplement)
The Glory Of Steel (warrior supplement)

Adventures available
Curse of the Warlock
Slaves of the Ring
Crystal Ball
Revenge of Kedan

External links
 Lasalion Games website, via the Internet Archive

Fantasy role-playing games
Indie role-playing games
Role-playing games introduced in 1997